Timothy Kain and Virginia Taylor are an Australian music duo based in Canberra. Their album Music of the Americas was nominated for 2000 ARIA Award for Best World Music Album.

Timothy Kain was born on 25 January 1951, outside Canberra.

Members
 Timothy Kain - guitar
 Virginia Taylor - flute

Discography

Albums

Awards and nominations

ARIA Music Awards
The ARIA Music Awards is an annual awards ceremony that recognises excellence, innovation, and achievement across all genres of Australian music. They commenced in 1987.

! 
|-
| 2000
| Music of the Americase
| ARIA Award for Best World Music Album
| 
| 
|-

References

Australian world music groups
Australian musical duos